Pelo is a surname. Notable people with the surname include:

Brad Pelo (born 1963), American businessman
Dimitri Pelo (born 1985), French rugby league player
Vincent Pelo (born 1988), French rugby union player

See also
PELO, a protein
Pelo Madueño (born 1968), Peruvian musician and actor